The Tramway at Villeneuve-sur-Verberie (French La voie ferrée de Villeneuve-sur-Verberie et Roberval à Moru) was a  long narrow-gauge railway with a gauge of  from the sand pits at Villeneuve-sur-Verberie and Roberval to the port at Moru (Pontpoint) on the Oise in the  department Oise in the north of France.

Route 

The narrow-gauge track started at the Sablière de Villeneuve sand pit, followed a side road through Roberval to the lower station of the funicular railway of the Carrière du Carnage quarry. From there it went through the hamlet of Le Guidon, to the depot at the lower station of the funicular of the Gravière du Plant gravel pit in Roberval and ended at the wharf of Moru on the Oise.

History 
The light railway was first laid at the end of the 19th century. The locomotives and carriages were confiscated by the army during World War I and used at the front. The Gravière du Plant gravel pit ceased operations around 1918, but the Carrière du Carnage quarry and the Villeneuve-sur-Verberie sand pit remained in use.

The Société des Sablières de l'Oise, which owned three quarries in the area, had the railway lines re-laid in 1920. The tracks from Fleurines to Pont-Sainte-Maxence were lifted and instead laid between Villeneuve-sur-Verberie and Moru. This enabled more powerful motor locomotives to pull up to 22 carriages weighing 2.5 tonnes each, compared with only 12 carriages for the steam locomotives. Sand production at the Villeneuve sand pit was equivalent to around 420 tonnes per day, which was equivalent to the load of 1½ barges.

When the Northern Motorway (A1) was built, the track had to be dismantled in 1964. The locomotives and wagons were sold to a civil engineering company and the amusement park La Mer de Sable in Ermenonville. The sand pit was served by lorries until it was closed in 1982 and was later used as a rubbish pit.

Locomotives 
The following locomotives were used on the line:

 4 Baldwin 
 1 English steam locomotive
 1 Popineau
 3 Gmeinder 
 3 Deutz
 1 Baldwin-Willeme 
 1 O&K
 1 Hunslet 2-6-0

External links 
 Patrick De Decker & Marc A. Dubout:  Le petit train des sablières de l’Oise. (French Word file without photos) November 2004.
 Les petits trains des sablières. (French HTML files with thumbnails of low-resolution photos that can be enlarged by clicking onto them)
 Le petit train.
 En suivant la voie du petit train.
 Les locomotives.
 Le chargement du petit train à l'aide des pelleteuses.
 La carrière de Verberie. 
 Le hameau et l'usine de port de Moru.
 La fin du petit train.
 La presse en a parlé.
 Photos hier et d'aujourd'hui.
 Ce qui reste aujourd'hui.
 L'usine aujourd'hui.

References 

600 mm gauge railways in France
Tram transport in France
Railway lines opened in the 1890s
Railway lines closed in 1964